This article lists the winners and nominees for the Billboard Music Award for Top Artist. The award was first given in 1993, entitled #1 World Artist. It was retired during the 1994 ceremony but returned again the following year under the title Artist of the Year. It was later renamed to its current title in 2011. Drake is the only artist to have won the award three times. Taylor Swift is the most nominated artist in this category with eight nominations.

Winners and nominees
Winners are listed first and highlighted in bold.

1990s

2000s

2010s

2020s

Multiple wins and nominations

Wins
3 wins
 Drake

2 wins
 50 Cent
 Adele
 Destiny's Child
 Taylor Swift
 Usher

Nominations
8 nominations
 Taylor Swift

6 nominations
 Drake

4 nominations
 Justin Bieber
 Rihanna
 The Weeknd

3 nominations
 Adele
 Katy Perry
 Ariana Grande

2 nominations
 50 Cent
 Destiny's Child
 Eminem
 Lady Gaga
 LeAnn Rimes
 Maroon 5
 Nelly
 One Direction
 Sean Paul
 Post Malone
 Justin Timberlake
 Usher
 Bruno Mars

References

Billboard awards